André Doye (15 September 1924 – 29 November 1981) was a French professional footballer who played as a forward. He scored five goals in seven appearances for the France national team from 1950 to 1952. At club level, he most notably played for Bordeaux from 1948 to 1956, winning the Division 1 title in the 1949–50 season.

Honours 
Bordeaux

 Division 1: 1949–50
 Coupe de France runner-up: 1951–52, 1954–55

References 

1924 births
1981 deaths
Sportspeople from Nord (French department)
French footballers
Association football forwards
RC Lens players
Toulouse FC players
FC Girondins de Bordeaux players
FC Dieppe players
Ligue 1 players
Ligue 2 players
France international footballers
Footballers from Hauts-de-France